Rhodeus fangi is a subtropical freshwater fish belonging to the Acheilognathinae subfamily of the family Cyprinidae.  It originates in the Pearl River, Yangtze River  in China. It was originally described as Pararhodeus fangi by C.P. Miao in 1934.

Etymology
Named in honor of ichthyologist Fang Ping-Wen (sometimes transcribed as Bingwen, 1903-1944), Metropolitan Museum of Natural History, Academia Sinica (spelled “Sinerica” by Miao), Nanjing, China.

When spawning, the females deposit their eggs inside bivalves, where they hatch and the young remain until they can swim.

References 

Fish described in 1934
fangi